Clupisoma is a genus of catfish in the family Ailiidae native to Asia.

Species
There are currently 9 recognized species in this genus:
Clupisoma bastari A. K. Datta & A. K. Karmakar, 1980
Clupisoma garua (F. Hamilton, 1822) 
Clupisoma longianalis (S. Y. Huang, 1981)
Clupisoma montana Hora, 1937
Clupisoma naziri Mirza & M. I. Awan, 1973
Clupisoma nujiangense X. Y. Chen, Ferraris & J. X. Yang, 2005
Clupisoma prateri Hora, 1937
Clupisoma roosae Ferraris, 2004
Clupisoma sinense (S. Y. Huang, 1981)

References

Fish of Asia
Catfish genera
Taxa named by William John Swainson
Freshwater fish genera